Association Sportive Horizon Patho is a football club of New Caledonia,
 competing in the New Caledonia Super Ligue.

Stadium

The current the club stadium is the Stade La Roche, in the city of Maré, with a capacity for 3,000 spectators.

Players
Among the team's players are:

Goalkeepers:
Wilfried Caroine (23 years old) andLuc Washetine.

Defenders:
Jean-Baptiste Caroine (21 years old), Ludovic Wakanumuné (38 years old), Kiam Wanesse and Luc-André Washetine.

Midfielder:
Pierre Wawia (21 years old), Roberto Waia (19 years old), Henri Caroine (39 years old), Yoan Bearune (19 years old) and Jean-Claude Jewiné.

References

Football clubs in New Caledonia